Omukama Rukirabasaija Agutamba Solomon Gafabusa Iguru I (born 1948) is the 27th Omukama of Bunyoro from 1994 to present. The King's traditional alternative name used by family (known as empaako) is Amooti.

Solomon Iguru I rose to the throne in 1994. His father, Sir Winyi IV of Bunyoro, reigned  from 1927 to 1967. In 1967, the Ugandan government under Milton Obote abolished kingdoms.

In recent years, Solomon Iguru has  promoted and developed the Kingdom, such as establishing the institution of the Association of the Representatives of Bunyoro-Kitara.

On 13 July 2010 The International Organization – CCLP Worldwide (Special Consultative Status with UN ECOSOC) bestowed the highest honor of the organization to Solomon Iguri for his services to the people of Bunyoro-Kitara.

His Majesty's status and position was formally recognised in the Uganda Gazette legal notice No. 303 of 2014.

Awards 
List of awards:
  Grandmaster, Royal Order of the Omujwaara Kondo
   Grandmaster, Royal Order of the Engabu
  Grandmaster, Most Honourable Order of Omukama Chwa II Kabalega
  Grand Cross, Royal Order of the Elephant of Godenu (Ghana)
  Grand Cordon, Royal and Hashemite Order of the Pearl (Sulu, Philippines)
  Grand Cross, Order of Saint Lazarus
  Grand Cross, Order of the Queen of Sheba (Ethiopia)
  Kabalega Star, Republic of Uganda
  Honorary Cross, Royal and Merciful Society of Belgium

Patron, Protector and Granter of The Chivalrous and Religious Order of the Crown of Thorns
Patron, Protector and Granter of The Sovereign, Knightly and Noble Order of The Lion and Black Cross
  Grand Cross Royal and Dynastic Order of the Eagle of Hohoe

See also
 List of current constituent African monarchs
 Omukama of Bunyoro
 Mparo Tombs
 Bunyoro
 Association of the Representatives of Bunyoro-Kitara
 Heraldry Society of Africa

References 

Bunyoro
Ugandan monarchies
1948 births
Living people